Peter Öberg (born August 3, 1982) is a Swedish ice hockey player. He is currently playing with Modo Hockey in the HockeyAllsvenskan (Allsv).

Playing career
Öberg made his Elitserien debut with Modo Hockey on March 6, 1999. He became a regular at the elite level in 2001, and was with Modo Hockey when they won the Elitserien Champion in 2007.

In 2008, Öberg relocated to Russia where he played with Gazovik Tyumen and Gazovik Univer in the Russian lower leagues before moving to Finland where he played five games with KalPa of the SM-liiga, and finished the season 2008–09 season with VIK Västerås HK of HockeyAllsvenskan. Oberg remained with VIK Västerås HK until March 30, 2012, when he re-signed to return to the Elitserien with Modo Hockey.

References

External links

1982 births
Living people
KalPa players
Modo Hockey players
Swedish ice hockey centres
Timrå IK players
VIK Västerås HK players
Sportspeople from Umeå